Egor Krimets ( or Yegor Krimets; , born 27 January 1992) is an Uzbek professional football player of Ukrainian descent who currently plays for Pakhtakor Tashkent.

Career

Club
Krimets started his professional career with Uzbek League giant Pakhtakor Tashkent in 2010. He moved to Chinese Super League side Beijing Guoan on a one-year loan deal on 25 January 2013.
On 11 January 2016, Krimets was loaned to Beijing Guoan again for two years.

In 2021, Krimets signed a new one-year contract with Pakhtakor Tashkent.

International
In November 2012, Krimets was first called up to the Uzbekistan national team for a 2014 FIFA World Cup qualification match which Uzbekistan played against Iran. He was an unused substitute in this match.

Career statistics

Club

International

International goals

Scores and results list Uzbekistans's goal tally first, score column indicates score after each Krimets goal.

Honours
Pakhtakor
 Uzbek League (5): 2012, 2014, 2015, 2019, 2020
 Uzbekistan Cup (2): 2011, 2019

References

External links

 

1992 births
Living people
Uzbekistani footballers
Uzbekistan international footballers
Chinese Super League players
Pakhtakor Tashkent FK players
Beijing Guoan F.C. players
Expatriate footballers in China
Uzbekistani expatriate footballers
Uzbekistani expatriate sportspeople in China
Uzbekistani people of Ukrainian descent
Sportspeople from Tashkent
Association football defenders
Footballers at the 2014 Asian Games
2015 AFC Asian Cup players
2019 AFC Asian Cup players
Asian Games competitors for Uzbekistan